Yitzhak Frenkel (1899–1981), also known as Alexandre Frenel, was an Israeli painter and sculptor, seen as the father of modern art in Israel. One of the most important Jewish artists of the l’École de Paris and its chief practitioner in Israel, gaining international recognition during his lifetime and exhibiting his work across the world.  

Considered the father of modern Israeli art. He is accredited with bringing the influence of the l’École de Paris to Israel, which until then was dominated by Orientalism.

Early life: Odessa 1899-1919
Yitzhak Frenkel was born in 1899 in Odessa, Russian Empire. He was a great-grandson of the famous Rabbi Levi Yitzchok of Berditchev. In his youth he studied in a yeshiva where he met Chaim Glicksberg. As a child he lived right next to Bialik's and Rawnitzki's publishing house "Moriah". In 1917, he studied under Aleksandra Ekster, an influential constructivist, cubist and futurist teacher and painter at the Fine Arts Academy in Odessa, one of the leading art schools in the Tsarist Russia. Frenkel immigrated to Mandate Palestine in 1919 as part of the first wave of settlers of the Third Aliyah, on board the famous Roslan Ship. He died in Tel Aviv in 1981 and was buried in Safed.

Revolutionizing Painting, 1920s and 1930s
In 1920, he established the artists' cooperative in Jaffa and an artists' studio in Gymnasia Herzliya where gave lessons in painting and sculpture. Later that year, he traveled to Paris where he studied at the École des Beaux-Arts and at the Académie de la Grande Chaumière at the studios of the sculptor Antoine Bourdelle and painter Henri Matisse. At the time his painting were abstract. Towards the end of 1920, Frenkel Frenel traveled to Egypt where he showcased his works in an exhibition before returning to Paris.

Frenkel lived in Montparnasse and worked as well as exhibited his work with his contemperories, Chaim Soutine, Michel Kikoine, Jules Pascin along with other Jewish artists of the École de Paris. He would also spend time in La Ruche, in Montparnasse where he would meet other painters of the era. 

In this first Parisian period he would also create abstract modernist works including sculpture and paintings that were characteristic of the avant-garde trends in the French Capital.

He exhibited at the Salon des Indépendants alongside other artists of his time, such as Soutine. They were both noticed by art critic Waldermar George. Waldermar George told Frenkel during the time "Do not return to Palestine, they will eat you there" (Frenkel would return in 1925). In 1924, the Dutch painter Piet Mondrian acquired two of his abstract paintings for an English collector. He also exhibited at the Salon d'Automne, and the Salon des Arts Sacrés.
Frenkel returned to Palestine in 1925 where he revolutionized painting. He opened the Histadrut Art School in Tel Aviv. In Israel he was considered extreme in his artistic orientations. His students included Shimshon Holzman, Mordechai Levanon, David Hendler, Joseph Kossonogi, and Siona Tagger. He was a mentor to Bezalel students Avigdor Stematsky, Yehezkel Streichman, Moshe Castel, and Arie Aroch. All those who studied under him absorbed French influence and most them would go to learn in Paris in the 1920s and 1930s. Frenkel's style was closer to the abstract painting to which he was exposed in Paris than the orientalism that was popular in Palestine at that time. He was the first abstract painter in Israel.

In 1926, he presented in the "Ohel" theater his abstract work, compositions of geometric shapes and alongside them landscape paintings. The exhibition in the Ohel was called "Modern Artists", Tel Aviv's response to the conservative Bezalel driven art in Jerusalem's Tower of David exhibition. Frenkel and his students featured heavily in "Modern Artists". In this period an expressionistic tendency in his work begins to arise, especially in his choice of colour. By the time he returned to Paris in 1929 his expressionist style came into form.

In 1927 his painting in the exhibition of the School Lebanim, is considered the piece that heralded the victory of the modernist art of the École de Paris over Bezalel's conservative school.

1930s: Return and settling of Safed 

In 1934, he made Safed his home, becoming the first artist to settle in the ancient holy city, 14 years before the "Artists' Colony" was formally established. There he painted the ancient synagogues, narrow lanes, local inhabitants and  surrounding countryside. During that period he completely abandons the abstract style and embarks in the search of other, vibrant styles. In that same year, he designed the "Adloyada" carnival in Tel Aviv. In 1936 he began designing sets and costumes for the "HaOhel" theater. He will continue engaging in the sort of work until 1949, continuing his work both for the "HaOhel" theater as well as the "HaBima" theater. During that same period he also painted portraits of several famous actors who worked for the said theaters.

In 1937, he embarked on a journey, painting Israel from point to point, North to South. He painted Safed, Jerusalem, Tel Aviv, the Negev desert as well as the Galilee. He made 13 exhibitions on the motif of Safed up-to 1950.

1940s: Historic Recording 
In the year 1948, the year of Israel's independence, he will be allowed to record historic milestones in the Israel's story. Painting the first meeting of the Knesset as well as the first meeting of the military committee of the IDF. He also made portraits of the first 120 MKs (Members of the Knesset).

In 1949, he would become one of the founders of the "Artists Colony of Safed". He chose to distance himself from most of the artists of the colony, leading to the colony's resentment of him. 

He was the first painter chosen by the State of Israel to represent the Jewish State at the Venice Bienniale. In 1950 he exhibited his work in the 25th and 26th Bienniale of Venice, representing Israel. In 1952 he exhibited again in Paris.

1950s and onwards: Frenel 

In 1954 he returned to France. There he studied glassworks and he created vitrages (Window glass work), which were ordered by the Baroness Alix de Rothshild for a chapel in Normandy in the north of France. During the six year period between 1954 and 1960 he started to sign his works as "Frenel"... This along with his vitrage made for a Christian chapel led some in Israel to believe he had abandoned Judaism for Christianity, a claim that is completely false. 

He is considered one of the most important Jewish "École de Paris" painters; along with Soutine, Mogdiliani, Kikone, Kremegne, Manne Katz and Paskin. He presented his work in one-man shows all over the world. By 1960 he had presented his works in one-man shows in museums and galleries stretching the globe from Europe and the Americas to South Africa and Asia. From 1960 he returns regularly to Israel. However, being outcast due to false rumours and the antagonism the tradition artistic establishment held toward him, he would be almost unable to exhibit his works in Israel and thereafter live in Paris and used Tzfat/Safed as his summer home.

In Safed, Frenel would at times instruct new students including Rolly Schaffer in the 1960s.

In 1973, his house reopened as a museum, the Frenkel Frenel Museum, showcasing his work. In July 1979, Frenkel had a one-man show at the Orangerie in Paris.

Expressionist works of Frenkel pinpoint the expression of inner experience rather than solely realistic portrayal, seeking to depict not objective reality but the subjective emotions and responses that objects and events arouse in them. His exalts colours reveal his most hidden emotions and express passion and drama. When he paints his wife Ilana, the colours express an erotical explosion.

In 1979 he had a One-man show at the famous "Orangerie" of Paris, in celebration of his 80th birthday; inaugurated by the President of the French Senate, Alain Poher.

He died in 1981 in Tel Aviv and was buried in Safed.

Awards and commemoration

Frenkel won the Dizengoff Prize for painting four times, in 1938, 1939, 1940 and again in 1948. He took part in the 24th and 25th Venice Biennales, firstly a pre-independence exhibit and then represented the first time Israel participated.

Exhibitions
 1950: Venice Biennale
 1924: Salon des Indépendants, Paris
 1924: Salon d'Automne
 1924: Salon de Société des Artistes Indépendants
 1950-1964 Romanet Gallery, Paris
 1954 Johannesburg - Durban - Cape Town
 1957: O'Hana Gallery, London
 1959 Max Bollag Gallery, Zürich
 1962: Gallery of Drap d'Or, Cannes
 1965 - Continental Gallery, New York City
 1967 - LIM Gallery, Tel Aviv
 1969: Stenziel Gallery, Munich
 1970: WESTART Gallery, New York City
 1972: Artistique International Gallery, Nice
 1973: Aqua Vella Gallery, Caracas
 1973: IBAM gallery, Rio de Janeiro
 1974: Galerie de Seine 38, Paris
 1974: Galerie Karsenty, Monaco
 1974: GAllery ALTULIDADES, São Paulo
 1975: Galerie Vendome, Paris "Hommage to Chagall"
 1975: Jean Apesteguy Gallery, Deauville
 1975: Museum of Art, Lima
 1976: Artistes Français
 1977: Israel Linke gallery, Amsterdam
 1977: Gallery Galjoen, Hertogenbosch
 1979: One man Show, Orangerie, Paris, inaugurated by President of French Senate

Prizes 
Dizengoff Prize (Tel Aviv) 1935;1938;1939;1940;1948
1st Prize for Litography-French pavilion-in the International Lithography Exhibition (Bruxelles Belgium)  1958
Grand prix de Paques(nude) 1972
Grand prix de Noel (expressionism) 1972
Grand prix International de Peinture de la Côte d’Azur en Frande Finale 1973
Grand prix International de Deauville 1973

Gallery

Selected collections
 Israel Museum, Jerusalem
 Frenkel Frenel House, Safed

See also
Visual arts in Israel
Safed
Beit Castel
Shimshon Holzman
Rolly Schaffer

References

Further reading
 Barzel, Amnon. Isaac Alexander Frenel. Jerusalem: Massada Press, 1974.
 Gumprecht-Linke, S. Frenel: École de Paris. Amsterdam: Israel Galerie Linka, 1977.

External links
 Official website
 3 artworks by Yitzhak Frenkel at the Ben Uri site

1899 births
1981 deaths
Jewish painters
Expressionist painters
Ukrainian Jews
Israeli Ashkenazi Jews
Soviet emigrants to Mandatory Palestine
École des Beaux-Arts alumni
Alumni of the Académie de la Grande Chaumière
20th-century Israeli painters